Mathapelo Christa Ramasimong (birth 3 June 2000) is a South African field hockey player for the South African national team.

International career

Under–18
She made her debut for the South Africa U–18 in 2018 at the African Youth Games in Algiers.

Under–21
Onthatile Zulu and her are the co-captains of the South Africa U21 team to compete in the FIH Women's Junior World Cup.

National team
She participated at the  2022 Women's FIH Hockey World Cup

Personal life
Christa it studied at the North-West University

References

External links

2000 births
Living people
South African female field hockey players
Field hockey players at the 2018 African Youth Games
North-West University Hockey Club players